Bruchia fulvipes is a species of beetle found in the family Chrysomelidae. It is found in Middle and South America.
Bruchia fulvipes was scientifically described for the first time in 1885 by Baly.

References 

Cassidinae
Beetles described in 1885